James Dennis, 1st Baron Tracton PC (1721–15 June 1782) was an Irish politician and judge.

Background
Dennis was the son of John Dennis, a timber merchant of Kinsale, Co. Cork, and Anne Bullen, daughter of William Bullen (d.1735), of Southwater and Bullen's Cove; Burgess of Kinsale.

Political and judicial career
Dennis was educated at Trinity College, Dublin and became a barrister. He was the legal advisor to Henry Boyle, 1st Earl of Shannon, who also became a close personal friend. He later sat as a member of the Irish House of Commons for Rathcormack between 1761 and 1768 and for Youghal between 1768 and 1777: his speeches in the House are said to have displayed his profound learning. He also served as  Serjeant-at-law (Ireland) and as Lord Chief Baron of the Exchequer in Ireland. He was sworn of the Irish Privy Council in 1777 and, at Lord Shannon's urging, was  raised to the Peerage of Ireland as Baron Tracton, of Tracton Abbey in the County of Cork, on 4 January 1781. He was a founding member of the popular drinking club, The Monks of the Screw.

Elrington Ball praised him as a man of great learning, perhaps the most intellectually gifted Irish judge of his time, and a man who was almost universally liked.

Personal life
In 1769, Dennis married Elizabeth Pigott, daughter of Emanuel Pigott of Chetwynd House, Co. Cork, but he died childless in June 1782. The barony died with him, but he left his estates to his two nephews, who in accordance with his will changed their surname to 'Dennis' and paid an annual jointure of £1,800 to their uncle's widow.

His nephews were the two sons of Thomas Swift (1711–1803), of Lynn, Co. Westmeath, who had married his only sister, Frances. Thomas Swift was the son of Meade Swift (b.1692) J.P., of Lynn, a first cousin of the famous Jonathan Swift and Sir Richard Meade (1697–1744) 3rd Bt., father of the 1st Earl of Clanwilliam. Lord Tracton left his estates in Co. Kerry to his first nephew, the Rev. Meade Swift-Dennis (1753–1837), who married Delia, daughter of Morley Saunders, of Saunders Grove, Co. Wicklow, and Martha, daughter of John Stratford, 1st Earl of Aldborough. Baron Tracton left his estates of Tracton Abbey, Co. Cork and Temple Hill House, Co. Dublin to his second nephew, John Swift-Dennis (d.1830), M.P. for Kinsale, Co. Cork.

References

1721 births
1782 deaths
Barons in the Peerage of Ireland
Peers of Ireland created by George III
Members of the Privy Council of Ireland
Members of the Parliament of Ireland (pre-1801) for County Cork constituencies
Members of the Irish House of Lords
Chief Barons of the Irish Exchequer
Serjeants-at-law (Ireland)
People from Kinsale
Alumni of Trinity College Dublin